A traverse is a lateral move or route when climbing or descending (including skiing); going mainly sideways rather than up or down. The general sense of 'a Traverse' is to cross, or cut across and in general mountaineering, a road or path traveled traverses the steep gradient of the face. In civil engineering, road bed cuttings (or 'traverses') dug by construction operations creating an navigable incline into a hillside traverse the slope, also cut across the gradient as does the skier, climber, or builder.

Climbing
In climbing, Traversing a climbing wall is a good warm-up exercise.

When moving laterally, the technique of crossing through is more efficient than shuffling.  In this, the limbs are crossed so that the moves are longer and more fluid.  The longer extension requires coordination between the hands and the feet to avoid over-extension of the upper or lower part of the body.

If two climbers are roped together for protection, the leader should secure the rope both before and after a difficult move when traversing.  This enables the following climber to remove the anchorage before making the difficult move while still having good security from the anchor point which was placed after the move.

References

Climbing techniques